The Arkansas Territory was a territory of the United States that existed from July 4, 1819, to June 15, 1836, when the final extent of Arkansas Territory was admitted to the Union as the State of Arkansas. Arkansas Post was the first territorial capital (1819–1821) and Little Rock was the second (1821–1836).

Etymology
The name Arkansas has been pronounced and spelled in a variety of fashions. The region was organized as the Territory of Arkansaw on March 2, 1819, but the final extent of the territory was admitted to the Union as the State of Arkansas on June 15, 1836. In 1881, the Arkansas General Assembly passed the following concurrent resolution (Arkansas Statutes, Title 1, Chapter 4, Section 105):
Whereas, confusion of practice has arisen in the pronunciation of the name of our state and it is deemed important that the true pronunciation should be determined for use in oral official proceedings.
And, whereas, the matter has been thoroughly investigated by the State Historical Society and the Eclectic Society of Little Rock, which have agreed upon the correct pronunciation as derived from history, and the early usage of the American immigrants.
Be it therefore resolved by both houses of the General Assembly, that the only true pronunciation of the name of the state, in the opinion of this body, is that received by the French from the native Indians and committed to writing in the French word representing the sound. It should be pronounced in three (3) syllables, with the final "s" silent, the "a" in each syllable with the Italian sound, and the accent on the first and last syllables. The pronunciation with the accent on the second syllable with the sound of "a" in "man" and the sounding of the terminal "s" is an innovation to be discouraged.

History
The first official use of the name Arkansas came in 1806 when the southern portion of New Madrid County in Louisiana Territory was designated as the District of Arkansas. In 1813, it became Arkansas County in Missouri Territory. When Missouri applied for statehood, it asked for a southern boundary at 36º30′, except for a small portion between the St. Francis River and the Mississippi River where it dropped to 36º. This became the northern boundary of what became Arkansas Territory.

On March 2, 1819, at the penultimate meeting of the 15th United States Congress, Congress passed the Arkansas organic act (3 Stat. L. 493), providing for the creation of the Arkansaw Territory on July 4, 1819, from the portion of the Missouri Territory lying south of a point on the Mississippi River at 36 degrees north latitude running west to the St. Francis River, then followed the river to 36 degrees 30 minutes north latitude, then west to the territorial boundary. This included all of the present state of Oklahoma south of the parallel 36°30' north.  The westernmost portion of the territory was removed on November 15, 1824, and a second westernmost portion was removed on May 6, 1828, reducing the territory to the extent of the present state of Arkansas.

Originally the western border of Missouri was intended to go due south to the Red River. During negotiations with the Choctaw in 1820, however, Andrew Jackson unknowingly ceded more of Arkansas Territory. Then in 1824, after further negotiations, the Choctaw agreed to move farther west, but only by "100 paces" of the garrison on Belle Point. This resulted in the bend in the common border at Fort Smith.

The territory originally had nine counties: Arkansas, Clark, Crawford (which included Lovely's Purchase), Hempstead, Independence, Lawrence, Miller,  Phillips, and Pulaskị.

Demographics

In the 1830 United States census, 23 counties in the Arkansas Territory reported the following population counts (after only 7 reported the following counts in the 1820 United States census):

These census counts did not include Native Americans, and the earlier count includes 1,617 slaves. Though a census of Cherokee was to be taken as part of the Jackson and McMinn Treaty in 1818, it was never conducted. Instead, when the treaty was renegotiated in 1819, it used John C. Calhoun's estimate of 5000 Cherokee in Arkansas, despite the Cherokee Nation's estimate of 3,500. The Quapaw were counted at 455 in the mid 1820s.

Law and government

Robert Crittenden was the territorial secretary until 1829 and the de facto territorial governor, preparing Arkansas for statehood. Until present-day Oklahoma received statehood, Fort Smith served as the ostensible legal authority overseeing the Indian Territory. The Army oversaw issues dealing with the Indian Nations.

See also
Adams–Onís Treaty
Arkansas Territorial Militia
Territorial evolution of the United States

References

Further reading

 "Act of March 2, 1819, ch. 49".  Statutes at Large.  Acts of the Fifteenth Congress of the United States, 2nd Session.  pg. 493–496.  From Library of Congress, A Century of Lawmaking for a New Nation: U.S. Congressional Documents and Debates, 1774–1875. (accessed 2007-06-16). This act of Congress established the territory of "Arkansaw".
 "Act of April 21, 1820, ch. 48".  Statutes at Large.  Acts of the Sixteenth Congress of the United States, 1st Session.  pg. 565.  From Library of Congress, A Century of Lawmaking for a New Nation: U.S. Congressional Documents and Debates, 1774–1875. (accessed 2007-06-16). This act of Congress modifies the act of March 2, 1819, and refers to the territory of "Arkansas". Thereafter, federal statutes describe it as the territory of Arkansas, although journals of both the House and Senate both continue to occasionally use "Arkansaw".

External links

 
 Encyclopedia of Oklahoma History and Culture – Arkansas Territory
 Oklahoma Digital Maps: Digital Collections of Oklahoma and Indian Territory

 
1819 establishments in Arkansas Territory
1810s in Arkansas Territory
.
.
1830s in Arkansas
1820s in Indian Territory
1830s in Indian Territory
1820s in the United States
1830s in the United States
1836 disestablishments in the United States
19th century in Arkansas
19th century in Oklahoma
Cherokee Nation (1794–1907)
Former organized territories of the United States
Pre-statehood history of Arkansas
Pre-statehood history of Oklahoma
Southern United States
States and territories established in 1819
States and territories disestablished in 1836
Quapaw